John Pillsbury Snyder (January 8, 1888–July 22, 1959) was an American businessman and politician.

Snyder was born in Minneapolis, Minnesota. His grandfather was John S. Pillsbury. He went to the public schools and to University of Minnesota. Snyder married Nelle Stevenson Snyder. He served in the United States Army and was commissioned major. Snyder was involved with the banking and automobile businesses. Snyder served in the Minnesota House of Representatives in 1927 and 1928. Snyder died suddenly from a heart attack while playing golf at the Woodhill Golf Course in Orono, Minnesota. His father was Frederic Beal Snyder who also served in the Minnesota Legislature.

Notes

1888 births
1959 deaths
Businesspeople from Minneapolis
Military personnel from Minneapolis
Politicians from Minneapolis
RMS Titanic survivors
Pillsbury family
Members of the Minnesota House of Representatives
20th-century American politicians
20th-century American businesspeople